Patna Division is one of the nine administrative units of Bihar, a state in the east of India. Patna is the headquarters of the division. Established in 1829, it is one of the oldest divisions of the state.

History of administrative districts in Patna Division
Patna Division was established in 1829 along with Saran division (with districts of Saran, Champaran, Tirhut, and Shahabad) and Bhagalpur division (with Monghyr (now Munger), Purnea and Maldah districts) of Bihar, as 11th division in Bengal Presidency of British India. On March 1, 1834, the 10th division (or Saran) was abolished and merged into 11th (Patna) and 12th (Monghyr) divisions. Then Patna Division comprised the districts of Patna, Bihar, Saran, and Shahabad.

Districts, sub-divisions, and blocks

See also

Divisions of Bihar
Districts of Bihar

Note

References

External links

 
Divisions of Bihar
Divisions of British India